Versha Rani Sharma (born c. 1986) is an American journalist and editor. She is editor in chief of Teen Vogue. From 2015 to 2021 she was managing editor at NowThis, where she shared in a 2018 Edward R. Murrow Award for a documentary on Hurricane Maria's effects on Puerto Rico. She is on the board of the Online News Association.

Early life 
Sharma was born and raised in Alexandria, Louisiana, the daughter of Indian immigrants. She attended Bolton High School, graduating in 2004, then Centenary College of Louisiana in Shreveport, where she studied political science. She graduated in 2008, then worked on Barack Obama's 2008 presidential campaign.

Journalism career
Sharma began working in newsmedia as a writer and editor for Talking Points Memo and MSNBC's Lean Forward. She covered the 2012 United States presidential election for MSNBC's website. In 2015, she became managing editor at NowThis, where she shared in a 2018 Edward R. Murrow Award for her work on a documentary on Hurricane Maria's effects on Puerto Rico. "Puerto Rico: After the Hurricane" won for Excellence in Video in the Large Digital News Organization division.

In May 2021, she was named editor in chief of Teen Vogue. In assuming the role at Condé Nast, Sharma was part of an increase in women's newsroom leadership; Adweek noted she was one of "a dozen women…named editors in chief at some of the most influential publishers in the world" in 2021. CNN also noted her appointment as part of diversifying newsroom leadership that took place in 2021, as she became the first South Asian American to hold the role, and additionally discussed the growing expectations for change to newsroom culture, beyond the new heads. Sharma told CNN that concern for the state of her team was a management priority for her, saying, "I pride myself on being a leader with empathy. Despite the fact that our job is storytelling, a lot of newsroom leaders don't value that or prioritize that."

Sharma is also a member of the board of the Online News Association.

Personal life
Sharma has lived in New York since 2009. She is married to journalist and author Casey Michel. They have a golden retriever named George.

References

External links
 

Living people
American magazine editors
Condé Nast people
Journalists from Louisiana
Centenary College of Louisiana alumni
American women journalists
Year of birth missing (living people)
American people of Indian descent